Mohammed Abbas (born December 24, 1980 in Giza) is a professional squash player who represented Egypt. He reached a career-high international ranking of World No. 13 in April 2007.

In 2016, Abbas became the first Egyptian title holder of World Masters Squash Championships, after winning in the 35+ division.

References

External links 

Egyptian male squash players
Living people
Sportspeople from Giza
1980 births
African Games silver medalists for Egypt
African Games medalists in squash
Competitors at the 2003 All-Africa Games
21st-century Egyptian people